The following companies claim to have successfully implemented Six Sigma in some form or another:

 3M
 Amazon
 Atos
 Autoliv
 BAE Systems
 Bank of America
 Becton Dickinson
 Bechtel
 Boeing
 Caterpillar Inc.
 Computer Sciences Corporation
 Convergys
 Cooper Tire & Rubber Company
 Credit Suisse
 Damco
 Deere & Company
 Dell
 Denso
 Eastman Kodak Company
 Evonik Industries
 Ford Motor Company
 General Electric
 Google
 Inventec
 Maersk
 McKesson Corporation
 Motorola
 Mumbai's dabbawalas
 Northrop Grumman
 PolyOne Corporation
 Raytheon
 Sears
 Shop Direct
 Unipart
 United States Army
 United States Marine Corps
 The Vanguard Group
 Wipro

References

Six Sigma companies